Maria Carmenza Morales Rendón (born July 21, 1966 in Jardín, Antioquia) is an athlete from Colombia, who competes in triathlon. Morales competed at the first Olympic triathlon at the 2000 Summer Olympics.  She took thirty-seventh place with a total time of 2:13:43.38.

References
sports-reference

1966 births
Living people
People from Itagüí
Colombian female triathletes
Triathletes at the 1995 Pan American Games
Triathletes at the 1999 Pan American Games
Triathletes at the 2000 Summer Olympics
Triathletes at the 2003 Pan American Games
Triathletes at the 2007 Pan American Games
Olympic triathletes of Colombia
Pan American Games competitors for Colombia
Sportspeople from Antioquia Department
20th-century Colombian women
21st-century Colombian women